Sir Richard Gordon Turnbull, GCMG (7 July 1909 – 21 December 1998) was a British colonial governor and the last governor of the British mandate of Tanganyika from 1958 to 1961. Following the country's independence, he was governor-general from 9 December 1961 to 9 December 1962.

Biography
Richard Turnbull was chief secretary of Kenya during the Mau Mau Uprising. In 1958, he succeeded Edward Twining as governor of Tanganyika. Following the first elections to the Legislative Council, Turnbull appointed five members of Julius Nyerere's Tanganyika African National Union party. At the end of 1961, Tanganyika became independent with Nyerere as prime minister and Turnbull as governor-general. He served for a year until Tanganyika became a republic in December 1962. He later became the penultimate High Commissioner of Aden in 1965.

References

1909 births
1998 deaths
Governors of Tanganyika (territory)
Knights Grand Cross of the Order of St Michael and St George
Colony of Aden people
Chief Secretaries of Kenya
People from St Albans